Sinoascus paillatus is an extinct species of stem-group ctenophore, known from the Maotianshan shales of Yunnan, China. It is dated to Cambrian Stage 3 and belongs to late Early Cambrian strata.

Fossil specimens are poorly preserved, providing little details, if any at all, about the anatomy of the comb rows.

See also

Burgess shale ctenophores
Fasciculus vesanus
Ctenorhabdotus capulus
Xanioascus canadensis

Maotianshan shales ctenophores
Maotianoascus octonarius
Stromatoveris psygmoglena

References

Maotianshan shales fossils
Monotypic ctenophore genera
Prehistoric ctenophore genera